The France national under-21 football team, known in France as Les Espoirs (The Hopes), is the national under-21 football team of France and is controlled by the French Football Federation. The team competes in the UEFA European Under-21 Football Championship, held every two years.

Following the realignment of UEFA's youth competitions in 1976, under-21 football teams in Europe were formed. The team is exclusively for football players that are age 21 or under at the start of the two-year campaign of the UEFA European Under-21 Football Championship meaning a player can represent the national team until the age of 23.

France has won the UEFA European Under-21 Football Championship once in 1988. Notable players on the team that went on to play for the senior national team include Laurent Blanc, Eric Cantona, Franck Sauzée, and Jocelyn Angloma, among others. Blanc was named the tournament's Golden Player. The team's best finish since was in 2002 when the team finished runner-up to the Czech Republic in Switzerland.

The France under-21 team does not have a permanent home. The team plays in stadiums located all around France, particularly grounds of Ligue 2 clubs. Because of the smaller demand compared to the senior national team, smaller facilities are used. Recently, the under-21 team has established the Stade Auguste-Delaune II, home of Stade Reims, as a home residence having played numerous matches there over the past two seasons.

History
Though, under-21 teams weren't formed until 1976, Les Espoirs, a youth national team in France, had existed since 1950 playing its first match on 22 May 1952 defeating England 7–1 at the Stade Jules Deschaseaux in Le Havre. The team's next match was two years later suffering a 3–1 defeat to Italy in Vicenza. For the rest of the decade, the youth team played seven more matches, which included a 1–1 draw with Hungary in Budapest and a 2–0 loss to England in Sunderland in 1959. In the 1960s, Espoirs continued to play matches against fellow national youth sides. However, on 18 December 1968, the team contested a match against Algeria senior team in Algiers recording an impressive 5–2 victory. Four days later, the team draw 1–1 with the under-23 team of Algeria in Oran. On 12 February 1969, the Espoirs played the Hungary senior team at the Stade Gerland in Lyon. The match ended in a 2–2 draw.

Team image

Media coverage
France's under-21 football friendlies and qualifying matches are broadcast by Direct 8.

Results and fixtures

Legend

2021

2022

Coaching staff

Current coaching staff

Players

Current squad
For the 2021–22 and 2022–23 seasons, including the 2023 UEFA European Under-21 Championship, players born on or after 1 January 2000 are eligible.

The following 23 players were called up for friendly matches against Norway on 19 November 2022, respectively.

Note: Names in italics denote players that have been capped by the senior team.

Caps and goals as of 19 November 2022, after the team's match against .

Recent call-ups
The following players have also been called up to the France under-21 squad and remain eligible:

Notes
Players in italics have played at senior level.
COV Withdrew due to COVID-19
CLU Player withdrew from the squad because of a club necessity.
INJ Player withdrew from the squad due to an injury.
SEN Player withdrew from the squad due to a call up to the senior team.
SH Player sent home by team staff.

Previous squads

U-21 European Championship squads
2019 UEFA Under-21 Football Championship squads – France
2006 UEFA Under-21 Football Championship squads – France
2002 UEFA Under-21 Football Championship squads – France
1996 UEFA Under-21 Football Championship squads – France

Honours
 UEFA European Under-21 Football Championship
Champions (1): 1988
Runners-up (1): 2002

 Toulon Tournament
Champions (12): 1977, 1984, 1985, 1987, 1988, 1989, 1997, 2004, 2005, 2006, 2007, 2015
Finalists (14): 1975, 1976, 1978, 1980, 1986, 1991, 1993, 1995, 1996, 1998, 2009, 2011, 2014, 2016

Competitive record

UEFA U-23 Championship
 1972: Did not qualify. Finished 4th of 4 in qualification group.
 1974: Did not qualify. Finished 3rd of 3 in qualification group.
 1976: Losing quarter-finalists.

UEFA European Under-21 Championship

*Draws include knockout matches decided via penalty shoot-out.
**Gold background colour indicates that the tournament was won. Red border colour indicates tournament was held on home soil.

2021 UEFA European Under-21 Championship

Qualification

See also
Sport in France
Football in France
Women's football in France
France national football team
France women's national football team

References

External links

Official site
UEFA.com U-21 site
U-21 Championships archives

 
European national under-21 association football teams
Youth football in France